Xie Xuehong (17 October 1901 – 5 November 1970), born Xie Shi Anu, was a Chinese politician. A women's rights activist, she cofounded the Taiwanese Communist Party, active in Japanese Taiwan. Persecuted by the Kuomintang after its forces retreated to Taiwan, she escaped to mainland China, where she became a member of the Taiwan Democratic Self-Government League and the Chinese Communist Party.

Biography
Xie was born in Changhua County in 1901 to a working-class family, the fourth of seven children. She assumed at least five other names throughout her lifetime. At the age of twelve, she moved in with another family. Her adoptive family was abusive, and, instead of entering an arranged marriage with their son, Hong Xinhu, she left their home. Xie met and married Zhang Shumin in 1918. For a time, the couple lived in Kobe, Japan, where the Taishō period of democracy heavily influenced Xie. Soon after Xie and Zhang moved to China, the couple split, as Xie had discovered that Zhang was still married to another woman. Xie then began to give sewing lessons, while also making and selling clothes. The May Fourth Movement was a political turning point for Xie, and she later joined Chiang Wei-shui's resistance against Japanese rule. Xie studied sociology at Shanghai University and took part in the May Thirtieth Movement of 1925, the same year she was told to join the Chinese Communist Party. Xie then moved to Moscow for further education at the Communist University of the Toilers of the East, which she attended for two years. In November 1927, she returned to China and began taking actions that led to the founding of the Taiwanese Communist Party (TCP) in 1928. At the direction of Sen Katayama, cofounder of the Japanese Communist Party (JCP), Xie and  began recruiting for what would become the TCP in Shanghai. Both traveled to Japan to seek help from the JCP on a draft of a party charter, which was smuggled by Xie past Japanese authorities in Shanghai upon her return to China in February 1928. The TCP's charter was approved by a Chinese Communist Party official using the pseudonym Peng Jung on 13 April 1928, and the Taiwanese Communist Party's founding ceremony was held two days later.  

Xie's ideology spread to Chiang's Taiwanese People's Party and Taiwanese Cultural Association after she took on leadership positions in the two groups. She believed that a maintaining a distinct Taiwanese identity and allowing bourgeoisie to participate would allow communism to flourish in Taiwan. Others disagreed and Xie was expelled from the Taiwanese Communist Party in 1931. Later that year, she was arrested and sentenced to 13 years imprisonment for advocating communism. In 1939, Xie was released after catching tuberculosis.

Xie returned to political activism in 1945, when Kuomintang forces arrived in Taiwan, stating that "Taiwan must be ruled by Taiwanese." In September 1946, Xie established the  Taiwan People’s Association, which was disestablished by the Kuomintang government in January 1947. In 1947, she convened the 27 Brigade and was involved in the February 28 incident from her home base in Taichung, telling the masses not to damage property or injure anyone. Three weeks later, she escaped to Hong Kong, where she founded the Taiwan Democratic Self-Government League, and later moved to Xiamen. Under Xie's leadership, the league opposed the aims of the Formosan League for Reemancipation, which backed formal independence or trusteeship. At its founding, Taimeng backed liberation of Taiwan from the control of Chiang Kai-shek and the Kuomintang. In China, Xie was active in the China Youth League and served on the Chinese People's Political Consultative Conference. However, Xie continued to push for Taiwan's right to self-determination, views for which the Chinese Communist Party targeted her during the Anti-Rightist Campaign. Actions taken against Xie included her removal as leader of Taimeng, her expulsion from the CCP and removal from the National People's Congress, all in 1958. Xie died in Beijing in 1970, a victim of the Cultural Revolution. She was posthumously rehabilitated by the Chinese Communist Party in 1986.

References

Politicians of the Republic of China on Taiwan from Changhua County
Members of the Taiwan Democratic Self-Government League
20th-century Taiwanese women politicians
Chinese women's rights activists
Taiwanese expatriates in Japan
1901 births
1970 deaths
Deaths from lung cancer in the People's Republic of China
People persecuted to death during the Cultural Revolution
February 28 incident
Leaders of political parties in China
Shanghai University alumni
Socialist feminists
Prisoners and detainees of Japan
Taiwanese political party founders
Taiwanese feminists
Taiwanese emigrants to China
Taiwanese people of Hoklo descent
Taiwanese revolutionaries
Taiwanese prisoners and detainees
Communist University of the Toilers of the East alumni
20th-century Chinese women politicians
Taiwanese women founders
Burials at Babaoshan Revolutionary Cemetery